is a castle structure in Tone, Gunma Prefecture, Japan. The castle played historically important role because invasion of the castle by the Later Hōjō clan caused Siege of Odawara (1590). 

The castle is now only ruins, just some moats and earthworks. The castle was listed as one of the Continued Top 100 Japanese Castles in 2017.

See also
List of Historic Sites of Japan (Gunma)

References

Castles in Gunma Prefecture
Former castles in Japan
Ruined castles in Japan
Sanada clan
Go-Hōjō clan
1490s establishments in Japan
Historic Sites of Japan